Ie, ie, IE or I/E may refer to:

Arts and entertainment
Iced Earth, a band from Florida, US
Improv Everywhere, a comedy group
Into Eternity (band), a band from Canada
Individual events (speech), events centred around public speaking

Businesses and organizations
Iarnród Éireann, or Irish Rail
Identity Evropa, a white supremacist group in the United States
Ie (trading houses), a Japanese cottage industry
IE Business School, formerly Instituto de Empresa, a business school in Spain
Institut Eksekutif, an educational institution in Malaysia
Institute for Energy, of the European Union
Instituto Escuela (disambiguation), various entities
Solomon Airlines (IATA airline designator)

Language
id est (i.e.), Latin for "that is" or "in other words"
ie (digraph)
Indian English, the form of English spoken in the Republic of India
International English, a global English language
-ie, an English diminutive suffix
Ye (Cyrillic), also spelled Ie, a Cyrillic letter that looks exactly like the Latin E
Ukrainian Ye, also spelled Ie, the Cyrillic letter Є
Interlingue, originally the Occidental language (ISO 639-1 code IE)
Indo-European language family

Places
Republic of Ireland, by ISO 3166-1 alpha-2 code
Inland Empire, California, US
Ie, Okinawa, Japan
Old Irish name for the Scottish island of Iona (or Ì Chaluim Chille)
Ie, Noardeast-Fryslân, Netherlands

Science and technology

Computing
Internet Explorer, a web browser by Microsoft
.ie, Internet top-level domain for the Republic of Ireland
Industrial Ethernet, a version of Ethernet
Infinity Engine, a video game engine
Information extraction, a type of information retrieval
IntelliMouse Explorer, a brand of mouse by Microsoft

Other uses in science and technology
Inclusion/exclusion criteria, in clinical trials
Industrial ecology, the study of sustainable industrial systems
Industrial engineering, an engineering discipline
Information engineering, an engineering discipline
Infective endocarditis, a form of endocarditis caused by infectious agents
Information Element, a basic building block of wireless messages in a cellular network
Ionization energy, the energy required to strip an atom or molecule of an electron

Other uses
Ie, the classical Japanese family system
Ie, a shirt in traditional Romanian dress

See also
"i before e except after c", a spelling guideline of the English language
Indo-European (disambiguation), as in:
Indo-European languages
Proto-Indo-Europeans, Indo-European people
Indo-European studies
Ee, Dongeradeel, (West Frisian Ie), a Dutch village